The BSA A7 was a 500cc motorcycle model range made by Birmingham Small Arms Company (BSA) atitsr factory in Armoury Road, Small Heath, Birmingham. An improved  version based on the BSA A10 engine was launched in 1950. The various A7 models continued in production with minor modifications until 1961/2 when they were superseded by the unit-construction A50 model.

Development

After the 1938 launch of the Edward Turner designed Triumph Speed Twin, BSA needed a 500cc twin to compete with the Speed Twin. Designed by Herbert Parker, David Munro and BSA's chief designer, Val Page, the BSA A7 was the first of the BSA twin-cylinder motorcycles. The outbreak of World War II delayed the launch and several prototypes were built during the war years. The model was finally launched in September 1946 when hostilities had ended.

The very first A7 off the production line was flown to Paris for the first motorcycle show after the end of the war. There was huge demand for affordable transport after the war and the simplicity of the A7 twin was helped along by the slogan 'It's time YOU had a BSA!'.

Engine

A single camshaft behind the cylinders operated the valves via long pushrods passing through a tunnel in the cast iron block. This system needed a considerable number of studs and nuts to fasten down the cast iron cylinder head and rockerboxes, many of them deeply recessed and requiring well-made box spanners or the then uncommon sockets. As with other British motorcycles of the period, this kind of set-up regularly led to oil leaks.

In October 1949 BSA launched the Bert Hopwood designed 650 cc twin cylinder A10. The engine in the A10 was a redesigned and improved version of the A7 engine. A 497 version of the redesigned engine was produced for the A7. Initially fitted in the new A7S Star Twin, it was also fitted to the base A7 model in 1951.

Most motorcycles of this period tensioned the primary chain by drawing or rotating the gearbox backwards on a hinge with threaded rods, this was known as pre-unit construction. The first A7 had a fixed gearbox, bolted to the back of the crankcase, and an internal tensioner for the duplex primary chain. However, in 1954 when the swinging arm was introduced, the re-design reverted to the older system of a separate gearbox. The electrics (as was universal for larger British motorcycles of the period) consisted of two independent systems, the very reliable and self-contained Lucas magneto, with a dynamo generator to charge the battery and provide lights. Carburation was initially a single Amal remote float Type 6. Later Amal TT and then 376 Monobloc carbs were used.

Cycle Parts
The A7 was launched with a rigid frame and telescopic front forks. One useful feature was a hinged rear mudguard that lifted up to allow the rear wheel to be removed more easily.

Plunger rear suspension was offered as an option to the rigid frame from 1949. Concerned about the high wear rate of the plunger suspension that lead to poor handling a swinging arm frame was introduced in 1954 and the rigid and plunger frames discontinued.

Model Range

Overview of models

All models are swinging arm frame unless otherwise indicated.

Notes

A7

The A7 was launched in 1947 with a rigid frame and the "long stroke" engine with iron barrels and cylinder head. Plunger suspension was offered as an alternative from 1949. The engine was changed to the shorter stroke A10 based design in 1951. The rigid frame was discontinued in 1953 and the plunger in 1954. From 1954 the swinging arm frame was produced, and the name "Flash" given to the model in the US market. An alternator was offer as an alternative to the dynamo from 1961. Production ceased in 1962 when the unit construction A50 was introduced.

A7S Star Twin
In response to competition from the Triumph Tiger 100BSA launched the A7SS Star Twin. The new model had increased compression ratio. It had the later A10 based engine and the latest design of cylinder head with austenitic steel inlet and exhaust valves. The inlet manifold was separate from the cylinder head so twin carburettors could optionally be fitted. The uprated engine was fitted to a plunger frame and finished extra chrome. The model was produced with an option of rigid or plunger frames. In 1953 a new alloy head was fitted together with an Amal Monoblock carburettor. The model was discontinued in 1954 in favour of the "Shooting Star" model.

A7SS Shooting Star

The Shooting Star was introduced in 1954 with a new swinging arm frame. The engine had a hotter cam, and compression was upgraded from 6.6:1 to 7:1. The earlier models had a dark green frame and a separate carburetor manifold fitted to the alloy cylinder head. By the end of production in 1962 the BSA Shooting Star was the culmination of the development of the BSA A7, with a black frame with light green tank, mudguards and side panels, it had an alloy cylinder head, a duplex cradle frame with swinging arm rear suspension, full-width cast iron hubs and 8-inch drum brake at the front with a 7-inch at the rear.

Sporting Success

1952 Maudes Trophy
In 1952 three BSA A7s were entered for the Maudes Trophy and the International Six Days Trial, achieving  without problems and confirming the reliability of the design. All three bikes were randomly selected from the production line, picked up Gold medals and earned BSA the Team award as well as the Trophy. The three bikes were ridden by Brian Martin, Fred Rist and Norman Vanhouse. From Birmingham the team rode to Vienna then on through Germany, Denmark, Sweden and  Norway before returning safely and with a clean sheet to Birmingham.

American speed record
Also in 1952 American BSA dealer Hap Alzina prepared a BSA Star Twin for an attempt on the American Class C speed record for standard catalogue motorcycles.

1954 Daytona 200
In 1954 Bobby Hill won the Daytona 200 riding a rigid framed Shooting Star. (The rigid frame version was a special order from the factory). The race had one straight asphalt and the other on the beach during the 1950s. Of the 107 starters only 44 finished. Shooting Stars finished 1st, 2nd, 4th and 5th. A BSA Gold Star finished in 3rd.

Related Models
In 1960 the Akashi-based Kawasaki Aircraft Company acquired an interest in the Meguro motorcycle company, which had obtained a license to produce a copy of the 500 cc BSA A7. Meguro had been Japan's largest motorcycle manufacturer but in the late 1950s its models had become less competitive and it was short of money. Kawasaki's investment enabled Meguro to launch its A7 copy as the Meguro K.

In 1963 Meguro was taken over one hundred percent by the new Kawasaki Motorcycle Corporation, which maintained the licensing agreement with BSA and continued to build the K model, but due to lubrication problems Kawasaki made engine modifications and the Kawasaki K2 entered production in 1965 with improved crankshaft bearings and a larger oil pump. Since the introduction of the K2, the Meguro K model has tended to become known retrospectively as the K1.

In 1965 the K2 was enlarged to 624 cc to become the Meguro X-650 prototype, which was displayed at the 1965 Tokyo Motor Show. The X-650 then became in turn the prototype for the Kawasaki W1. For the new Kawasaki big bike, the traditional look of Meguro motorcycles was replaced with a sleeker fuel tank, sportier mudguards (fenders) and other details intended to appeal to export markets, especially North America.

See also
List of motorcycles of the 1940s

References

External links

 BSA A7 review
 Fully restored 1949 BSA A7
 BSA Sales Brochure

A7
Motorcycles introduced in the 1940s
Motorcycles powered by straight-twin engines